Marc Hempel (born May 25, 1957) is an American cartoonist/comics artist best known for his work on The Sandman with Neil Gaiman.

Biography
Writer and artist Marc Hempel grew up in the northwest suburbs of Chicago and now lives in Baltimore. He received a B.F.A. in Painting from Northern Illinois University in 1980. He and Mark Wheatley co-created the titles Breathtaker, Blood of the Innocent, and Mars. In 1994–1995, he collaborated with Neil Gaiman on the climactic story arc "The Kindly Ones" in The Sandman. Hempel's own creations Gregory and Tug & Buster were nominated for several industry awards, and his humor anthology Naked Brain was named "Best Comic Book" in the Baltimore City Paper'''s "Best of Baltimore 2003" issue. His art has also appeared in Marvel Fanfare, Epic Illustrated, Heavy Metal, Jonny Quest, Tarzan the Warrior, Clive Barker’s Hellraiser, Flinch, My Faith in Frankie, The Dreaming, Lucifer, and Disney Adventures.

Original art from The Sandman and Breathtaker was included in an exhibition entitled "LitGraphic: The World of the Graphic Novel," which originated at the Norman Rockwell Museum in Stockbridge, Massachusetts.

Hempel has created advertising art for print and television as well as character design for HBO Animation. He has produced CD art for the Nashville band Swamp Rat, drawn an episode of the online strip Munden's Bar for ComicMix.com, illustrated a 21–page Escapist story for Dark Horse Comics, and contributed to Mad, Nickelodeon Magazine, and SpongeBob Comics.

Awards
Marc Hempel received an Inkpot Award at the San Diego Comic-Con in 1992.

Bibliography

Apple Comics
 Blood of Dracula #1–2, 11 (1987–1989)

Art & Soul
 Tug & Buster #1–7 (1995–1998)

Comico Comics
 Jonny Quest #3, 10, 14–15, 17–18, 20, 22, 24–31 (1987–1988)

DC Comics
 Breathtaker #1–4 (1990) 
 Dreaming #34, 50 (1999–2000) 
 Flinch #5 (1999) 
 Gregory #1–4 (1989–1993) 
 The Invisibles #6 (1997) 
 Lucifer #55 (2004)
 Mad #484, 493, 498, 500, 504, 506 (2007–2010) 
 My Faith in Frankie #1–4 (2004) 
 Re-Gifters graphic novel (2007) 
 The Sandman #57–61, 63, 65–69 (1994–1995)
 Swamp Thing vol. 3 #13–16, 18 (2001)
 Who's Who in the DC Universe #9 (Vicki Vale) (1991)

Fantagraphics Books
 Anything Goes! #1 (1986) 
 Honk #1–3 (1986–1987)

First Comics
 Mars #1–12 (1984–1985)

HM Communications
 Heavy Metal #v5#11, #v6#3, #v6#8 (1982)

Insight Studios Group
 Naked Brain #1–3 (2002)

Malibu Comics
 Tarzan the Warrior #1–5 (1992)

Marvel Comics
 Amazing High Adventure #3 (1986) 
 Clive Barker's Hellraiser #20 (1993) 
 Epic Illustrated #4, 16, 31 (1980–1985)
 Marvel Fanfare #27 (Spider-Man) (1986)

WaRP Graphics
 Blood of the Innocent #1–4 (1986)
 Warp Graphics Annual'' #1 (1986)

References

External links
 Marc Hempel at Insight Studios Group
 
 Marc Hempel at Mike's Amazing World of Comics
 Marc Hempel at the Unofficial Handbook of Marvel Comics Creators

1957 births
20th-century American artists
21st-century American artists
Advertising artists and illustrators
American cartoonists
American comics artists
American comics writers
Artists from Baltimore
Artists from Chicago
DC Comics people
Inkpot Award winners
Living people
Marvel Comics people
Northern Illinois University alumni